Spencer Ross (born July 19, 1940) is an American sportscaster. With the exception of the New York Mets, Ross has called play-by-play for every professional New York metropolitan area sports franchise, including the Yankees of MLB, the Nets and Knicks of the NBA, and Jets and Giants of the NFL. He has also called games for the Americans of the ABA and, in the NHL, for the New Jersey Devils, New York Islanders and the New York Rangers. Outside of New York, he has called games for the Florida State Seminoles and Boston Celtics. Nationally, he has worked for the NFL on NBC, Major League Baseball on CBS Radio, the NCAA Division I men's basketball tournament on Westwood One, and as the lead play by play announcer for the 1992 USA Olympic Dream Team with Dick Vitale.

Ross's mentor was Marty Glickman, who tutored Ross at around the same time as his better-known pupil, Marv Albert. In fact, in discussing his two star pupils (Albert & Ross), Glickman once noted that Ross was one of the best, if not the best radio play-by-player ever to call a game citing his distinctive voice and ability to make smooth transitions during game play.  Further, Phil Rizzuto, one of Ross's broadcasting partners during his three-year tenure with the Yankees, was once quoted as saying that Ross was "The Best Broadcaster" he had ever worked with.

Ross attended Florida State University on a basketball scholarship and, while there, called baseball and basketball games for the Seminoles.

He currently does weekend sports updates for WINS-AM.

In 2009, he was inducted into the NYC Basketball Hall of Fame.

References

1940 births
Living people
American Basketball Association announcers
American sports announcers
Boston Celtics announcers
College basketball announcers in the United States
Florida State University alumni
Florida State Seminoles baseball
Florida State Seminoles basketball
Major League Baseball broadcasters
National Basketball Association broadcasters
National Football League announcers
National Hockey League broadcasters
New Jersey Devils announcers
New York Islanders announcers
New Jersey Nets announcers
New York Jets announcers
New York Knicks announcers
New York Rangers announcers
World Hockey Association broadcasters
New York Yankees announcers
North American Soccer League (1968–1984) commentators
People from Brooklyn
World Football League announcers
Major Indoor Soccer League (1978–1992) commentators